Sandra Navarro Gillette (born September 16, 1974), known mononymously as Gillette, is an American singer and rapper active in mid-1990s and early 2000s. She is best known for her 1994 worldwide hit "Short Dick Man", a song released alongside the production team 20 Fingers.

Life and career

1974–1994: Early life and "Short Dick Man"
Sandra Gillette was born in New Jersey as Sandra Navarro to a Puerto Rican mother and Mexican father and grew up in Chicago and Houston, singing and rapping her way through the 1990s. Gillette graduated from Romeoville High School in 1992. On August 31, 1994, Gillette released, alongside producers 20 Fingers, and her manager/sister, Yolanda Gillette their first single "Short Dick Man" on Zoo Entertainment/SOS Records, which was controversial. The tune was a global success, particularly in France where it was a number one hit for three weeks. It peaked the top 5 in several European countries such as Italy and Germany and also reached the top ten in other countries, including Austria, Belgium, New Zealand and Australia. It also reached number 14 in the U.S. and was considered a club success there. This single, which involves Gillette mocking the size of a man's penis, was also released in a clean version replacing the word "dick" with "short", which was also released under the censored title "Short, Short Man" in the U.K. and several other countries. This new version, remixed by Strike, reached No. 11, whereas the original only reached No. 21 in the UK Singles Chart in 1994. Manny Mohr of 20 Fingers told the Los Angeles Times that the point of the song was to attract attention. "We figured there were all these songs by men bashing women and treating women like sex objects. So we decided a song that turned the tables on men might attract some attention". According to Gillette, the point of the song is to "strike back at all the women-bashing songs in pop, especially in rap". In the accompanying music video, images of Gillette singing "Short Dick Man" or "Short Short Man" on a beach and other places alternate with those of a brawny man performing a photo session.

1994–1999: "On the Attack" and "Shake Your Money Maker"
After the massive global success of "Short Dick Man", the producers of 20 Fingers decided to release a full Gillette solo album, called "On the Attack" in Brazil, Canada, Scandinavia, Australia, Japan, Portugal, Chile, South Korea, U.S. and other selected countries, while in Poland and Germany, they released it as a 20 Fingers debut studio album, still credited as "20 Fingers feat. Gillette", retitled "On the Attack and More", an altered cover art and two bonus tracks. 20 Fingers continued to release the singles "Mr. Personality" and "You're a Dog" under the name "20 Fingers feat. Gillette" in Poland and Germany, while as Gillette solo releases everywhere else. In 1996, Gillette released her second studio album Shake Your Money Maker, again fully produced by 20 Fingers, and its three single releases "Do Fries Go With That Shake?", "Bounce" and "Shake Your Money Maker" between 1996 and 1997. The album and its three singles did not chart well.

2000–2004: "Did I Say That?" and Peekaboo Revue
In 2000, 20 Fingers wrote and produced the song "Sex Tonight" of Gillette's third solo album "Did I Say That", which was the first and only release out of the album and became a minor club hit in the U.S. Gillette was cast in several independent films and in 2004, she co-founded a Cabaret group called the Peekaboo Revue. After a year of performances, the group eventually went their own ways. Gillette has been retired from rapping and acting ever since.

Artistry

Musical style
Gillette's music is known for her monotone, heavy beats, sounds and melodies. It mixes dance with hip-hop, pop, rock, rap and europop, a style which was particularly popular in Europe, Oceania and South America in the 1990s. The vocals are very simple with catchy arrangements. Lyrically, her songs do not always follow a traditional verse-chorus structure (such as in "Short Dick Man"), with minimalistic and often repeating vocals; the catchy simplicity frequently led her songs to high recognition and lasting cult popularity. Her lyrics were distinguished by their humorous, risqué, and often sexually explicit nature, frequently resulting in controversy and Parental Advisory warning labels at the time of release.

Discography

Studio albums

Singles

Music videos
1994: "Short Dick Man"
1995: "Mr. Personality"
1996: "Do Fries Go with That Shake?"
1997: "Shake Your Money Maker"

Notes

References

1974 births
Living people
American dance musicians
Singers from New Jersey
Rappers from New Jersey
American musicians of Mexican descent
Hispanic and Latino American musicians
People from Romeoville, Illinois
20th-century American women singers
20th-century American singers
21st-century American women singers
21st-century American singers